2006 World Masters Athletics Indoor Championships is the second in a series of World Masters Athletics Indoor Championships (also called World Masters Athletics Championships Indoor, or WMACi). This second edition took place in Linz, Austria, from 15 to 20 March 2006.

The main venue was TipsArena Linz (called Intersport Arena Linz at the time),

which is reputedly one of the most beautiful indoor arenas in Europe.

The arena has a banked six-lane indoor track where the turns are raised to neutralize the centrifugal force of athletes running the curves. Supplemental venues included Linzer Stadion for throwing events.

This Championships was organized by World Masters Athletics (WMA) in coordination with a Local Organising Committee (LOC): Percy Hirsch, Wilhelm Koester, Brian Keaveney.

The WMA is the global governing body of the sport of athletics for athletes 35 years of age or older, setting rules for masters athletics competition.

A full range of indoor track and field events were held.

In addition to indoor competition, non-stadia events included Half Marathon,

8K Cross Country, 10K Race Walk, Weight Throw, Hammer Throw, Discus Throw and Javelin Throw.

Controversy
A disagreement involving a potentially illegal substitution of the British M65 4 x 200m relay team caused the British record holder Anthony Treacher to be suspended by the British Masters Athletic Federation.

Results
Official results are partially archived at Linz2006.

Past Championships results are archived at WMA.

Additional archives are available from European Masters Athletics

as a searchable pdf,

from British Masters Athletic Federation

as a searchable pdf,

from Masters Athletics

as a searchable pdf,

from Museum of Masters Track & Field as a National Masters News pdf newsletter,

and from Norwegian Athletics Association as a searchable pdf.

Several masters world records were set at this Indoor Championships. World records for 2006 are from infotraining.at

unless otherwise noted.

Women

Men

References

External links

German results
Canadian results

World Masters Athletics Championships
World Masters Athletics Championships
International athletics competitions hosted by Austria
2006
Masters athletics (track and field) records